Gerard Aldridge is a Canadian provincial politician. He was a Liberal member of the Legislative Assembly of Saskatchewan from 1995 to 1999, representing the constituency of Thunder Creek.

Electoral record

|-

|NDP
|Ivan Costley
|align="right"|1,496
|align="right"|19.96%
|align="right"|-10.90
|- bgcolor="white"
!align="left" colspan=3|Total
!align="right"|7,496
!align="right"|100.00%
!align="right"|

|-

| style="width: 130px"|Liberal
|Gerard Aldridge
|align="right"|2,859
|align="right"|37.49%
|align="right"|+13.65

|Prog. Conservative
|Janet Day
|align="right"|2,414
|align="right"|31.65%
|align="right"|-10.96

|NDP
|Lewis Draper
|align="right"|2,353
|align="right"|30.86%
|align="right"|-1.73
|- bgcolor="white"
!align="left" colspan=3|Total
!align="right"|7,626
!align="right"|100.00%
!align="right"|

References

Living people
1958 births
Saskatchewan Liberal Party MLAs
20th-century Canadian legislators